Despair or Despair at the Gate is a sculpture by Auguste Rodin that he conceived and developed from the early 1880s to c. 1890 as part of his The Gates of Hell project. The figure belongs to a company of damned souls found in the nine circles of Hell described by Dante in The Divine Comedy. Other title variations are Shade Holding her Foot, Woman Holding Her Foot, and Desperation. There are numerous versions of this work executed as both plaster and bronze casts and carved marble and limestone.

History and description

In the 1880s, Rodin created an initial version that was more upright and whose extended leg was almost vertical. This version of the figure appears several times in the right panel of The Gates of Hell. Rodin returned to the figure around 1890. This time, the woman's extended leg is horizontal and she is clasping her left foot with both hands. This version of the figure is found in the upper left panel of The Gates of Hell.

When it was first exhibited as a stand-alone work, the statue was named Shade Holding Her Foot. However, the unusual acrobatic pose doesn't correspond to any passage in The Divine Comedy or any other work of literature. It is more likely that Rodin just captured a moment when a tired model was stretching to relax her neck or back. When viewed from the side, the figure suggests a truss with triangular units.

It wasn't until 1900 that Rodin began describing the work as Despair.

Copies
There are over a dozen versions of the work in several mediums at the Musée Rodin. Other copies of the work can be found at:
 Victoria and Albert Museum, London
 Metropolitan Museum of Art, New York
 Maryhill Museum of Art, Maryhill, Washington
 Brooklyn Museum, New York
 National Museum of Western Art, Tokyo
 Stanford University, Stanford, California
 Rodin Museum, Philadelphia

See also
List of sculptures by Auguste Rodin

Notes

References

External links

Sculptures by Auguste Rodin
1890s sculptures
Sculptures of women
Nude sculptures
Works based on Inferno (Dante)